The Sydney SuperNight (formally known as the Beaurepaires Sydney SuperNight) is an annual motor racing event for Supercars, held at Sydney Motorsport Park in Eastern Creek, New South Wales. The event has been a semi-regular part of the Supercars Championship—and its previous incarnations, the Australian Touring Car Championship, Shell Championship Series and V8 Supercars Championship—since 1992. Since 2018, this is the only active Supercars event held in metropolitan Sydney.

In 2020, the event was held twice due to calendar changes caused by the COVID-19 pandemic. In 2021, it was held four times in four consecutive weekends again due to the pandemic.

Format
The event is held over two days, from Saturday to Sunday. Following two thirty-minute practice sessions on Saturday, a three-part knockout qualifying session determined the grid for the following 200 kilometre race. On Sunday, a single qualifying session determined the grid for the following 140 km race.

History

1990s
Opened in 1990 as Eastern Creek Raceway, the circuit hosted non-championship events before its first official ATCC event in 1992, including the 1990 Nissan Sydney 500 and the Winfield Triple Challenge. John Bowe won both races of the inaugural championship event, holding on in a close battle with Tony Longhurst in the first race. In 1994, Peter Brock scored the first race and round victories in the ATCC for the Holden Racing Team. The 1996 event was held on the shorter 'North' version of the circuit, enabling the third race of the event to be held at night. Craig Lowndes won the event, becoming the first driver to win an ATCC round on debut since David McKay won the very first ATCC round in 1960. Russell Ingall and Steven Richards also made their ATCC debuts on that weekend. The event was dropped from the calendar in 1998 but returned in 1999, a year which began a four-event winning streak for Mark Skaife and the Holden Racing Team at the event.

2000s
In the first race of the 2001 round, Greg Murphy was credited with a race win despite finishing third, after top two Lowndes and Marcos Ambrose were given post-race penalties for separate incidents. Murphy himself was then penalised for a jump start in the second race giving Skaife the race and round victory. Ambrose ended the Holden Racing Team streak by winning in 2003, the first of two championship events the circuit would hold in 2003 and 2004, the second being the season finale. was won by Marcos Ambrose, who secured his first championship win in the process. The 2003 event is perhaps best remembered for an incident between Russell Ingall and Mark Skaife, which has since been dubbed the "race rage" incident or the "shriek at the creek". Ingall and Skaife made contact exiting Turn 9 which resulted in Skaife being spun into the wall. Having parked his damaged car on the other side of the track, Skaife remained next to his car, waiting for Ingall to return on the following lap. Skaife walked towards the edge of the circuit, shaking his fist at Ingall, and Ingall responded by swerving towards Skaife. Ingall was disqualified from the event and both drivers were fined. 

In 2004's first round, Rick Kelly broke the record for the lowest starting position from which an ATCC or Supercars round had been won, winning from seventeenth on the grid in wet conditions. Lowndes and Garth Tander, who completed the podium, started sixteenth and fifteenth respectively in a very wet race. In 2004's finale, Ambrose claimed his second successive championship title in race shortened due to heavy rain. In 2005, Lowndes took the first Supercars race and round win for Triple Eight Race Engineering, before the event dropped off the calendar again in 2006. In winning the event in 2007, Skaife broke Peter Brock's long-standing record of 37 round victories in the ATCC and Supercars Championship, taking his 38th win which was also his final solo round win. His teammate Todd Kelly made it a one-two finish for the Holden Racing Team, while Jamie Whincup was disqualified from the third race for using illegal rear brake rotors. The event was held on the Queen's Birthday long weekend, with qualifying and the first race on Sunday and the final two races on the Monday. In 2008, Will Davison took his first Supercars round win and the first for Dick Johnson Racing since 2001. Eastern Creek was dropped from the calendar in 2009, with the Sydney event moving to the Homebush Street Circuit, known as the Sydney 500.

2010s
After hosting the series' pre-season test day in 2011, the renamed Sydney Motorsport Park returned to the Supercars calendar in 2012 as a late addition. As part of the renovation and name change, the layout was slightly changed, with the kink at turn 6 removed. The circuit was again removed from the calendar in 2013 before returning in 2014. The 2014 and 2015 events included rain-affected races, with the events won by Shane van Gisbergen and Chaz Mostert respectively. In the 2016 event Jamie Whincup won his 100th championship race, defeating Craig Lowndes, who was driving in his record 600th championship race, in a race-long battle. One year later, Whincup won his 106th championship race at the Sydney event, surpassing Lowndes' record of 105 wins.

In 2018, the event format changed to feature a single 300 kilometre race at night, the first event under lights in the championship since the 2011 Yas V8 400 and the first in Australia since the 1997 Calder Park round. It was originally planned to use the 2.8km Druitt circuit, similar to what was used for the 1996 night event, however after further testing of the lighting system, it was decided that the 3.9km Gardner Circuit would be used, like all other previous events at the circuit. The race itself was won by van Gisbergen, who overtook Scott McLaughlin in a late race battle following a safety car. The event was excluded from the schedule for the 2019 Supercars Championship, with an intention of returning to the calendar early in the 2020 season with permanent lights to be installed.

2020s
As intended, the event was announced as part of the 2020 Supercars Championship, albeit retaining its previous August slot. However, the event was then brought forward to June as the return race for the championship after it was suspended due to the COVID-19 pandemic. The event was run as a two-day daytime event run behind closed doors. In addition to this, it was later announced the circuit will host a second event in 2020, as in 2003 and 2004. After the first of these was held, won by McLaughlin, a third day/night event at the circuit was scheduled for July 2020, to replace the Winton Super400 which was postponed due to further border restrictions caused by the pandemic. The second 2020 event had dual tyre compounds which led to mixed race results, including the first championship race victory for Jack Le Brocq, due to high degradation and a limited tyre bank. Despite the mixed results, McLaughlin again won the round. The planned third event for the year was later cancelled.

Winners

Notes
  – The 1996 event was held on the original North Circuit. All other years have been held on the Grand Prix (Gardner) layout.  
  – In 2003 and 2004, Sydney Motorsport Park (née Eastern Creek) also hosted a second round of the V8 Supercars Championship Series, the season finale.
  – In 2020, Sydney Motorsport Park hosted consecutive rounds of the Supercars Championship, each known as the Sydney SuperSprint.
  – In 2021, Sydney Motorsport Park hosted four consecutive rounds of the Supercars Championship, three known as the Sydney SuperNight and one known as the Sydney SuperSprint

Multiple winners

By driver

By team

By manufacturer

 Notes
  – Walkinshaw Andretti United was known as Holden Racing Team from 1990 to 2016, hence their statistics are combined.
  – Dick Johnson Racing was known as DJR Team Penske from 2015 to 2020, hence their statistics are combined.

Event names and sponsors
 1992–97, 1999–2005, 2007–08: Eastern Creek
 2003: VIP Petfoods Main Event
 2004: BigPond Grand Finale
 2012: Sydney Motorsport Park 360
 2014: Sydney Motorsport Park 400
 2015: Sydney Super Sprint
 2016–17: Red Rooster SuperSprint
 2018: Red Rooster Sydney SuperNight 300
 2020–21: BP Ultimate Sydney SuperSprint
 2020: Truck Assist Sydney SuperSprint
 2021: Bunnings Trade Sydney SuperNight
 2021: Armor All Sydney SuperNight
 2021–: Beaurepaires Sydney SuperNight

See also
 List of Australian Touring Car Championship races

References

Sports competitions in Sydney
Supercars Championship races
Motorsport in Sydney